General Burnham may refer tp:

Hiram Burnham (1814–1864), Union Army brigadier general
Robert F. Burnham (1913–1969), U.S. Air Force brigadier general
William P. Burnham (1860−1930), U.S. Army major general